Guerrieri is an Italian surname. Notable people with the surname include:

 Ascenzio Guerrieri (died 1645), Roman Catholic prelate who served as Bishop of Castellaneta 
 Esteban Guerrieri (born 1985), Argentine racing driver
 Gerardo Guerrieri (1920-1986), Italian film director, playwright and screenwriter
 Guido Guerrieri (born 1996), Italian footballer
 Giovanni Francesco Guerrieri (1589-1655), Italian painter
 Lorenza Guerrieri (born 1944), Italian actress
 Romolo Guerrieri (born 1931), Italian film director and screenwriter
 Taylor Guerrieri (born 1992), American professional baseball pitcher
 Vittorio Guerrieri (born 1958), Italian actor and voice actor
 

Italian-language surnames